Pressure ratio may refer to:

 Compression ratio, for piston engines
 Overall pressure ratio, for gas turbine engines
 Pressure ratio, the compression ratio of a gas compressor